Eidskyrkja or Kyrkjefjellet is a mountain in Volda Municipality in Møre og Romsdal county, Norway. The mountain is located just north of the border between Møre og Romsdal county and Sogn og Fjordane county.

See also
List of mountains of Norway

References

Mountains of Møre og Romsdal
Volda
Sunnmøre